Calliostoma syungokannoi is a species of sea snail, a marine gastropod mollusk in the family Calliostomatidae.

Some authors place this taxon in the subgenus Calliostoma (Kombologion).

Description

Distribution
This species occurs in the Andaman Sea.

References

 Kosuge, S., 1998. Descriptions of two new species of the genus Calliostoma (Gastropoda, Trochidae) from Indonesia and Indian Ocean. Bulletin of the Institute of Malacology, Tokyo 3(5):72–74, pl. 23.

syungokannoi
Molluscs of the Indian Ocean
Gastropods described in 1998